Fernanda Lessa (born April 15, 1977, in Rio de Janeiro, Brazil) is a Brazilian top model.

She started her career very early and moved to Milan after a few years. She first became famous in the year 2000 because of her photo appearing on the cover of GQ magazine, and because of a spot for Campari. She then appeared with Christian Vieri in an ad for Alice ADSL. Lessa is a professional DJ and tours famous Italian clubs with her DJ set show.
She recorded two albums: Glamset By Fernanda Lessa (Stefano Cecchi Records, 2006) and Fernanda Lessa's Collection - Electro Style (Universal Records, 2007). She worked for Italian TV, hosting fashion shows and attending several chat shows. In 2006, she participated in the reality show L'Isola dei Famosi (The Italian version of Celebrity Survivor) and was the first evicted by the audience.

References

External links 
 
 

1977 births
Living people
Brazilian female models
Brazilian expatriates in Italy
Italian showgirls
Survivor (franchise) contestants
Participants in Italian reality television series
Mass media people from Milan